Blue daisy may refer to:

Plant species
Felicia amelloides, also known as "blue marguerite"
Cichorium intybus, more commonly called "chicory"

Other
"Blue Daisy" (song), a 2010 song by the Japanese rock band The Brilliant Green
 Blue Daisy (musician), British electronic musician